Ataxia cayensis is a species of beetle in the family Cerambycidae. It was described by Chemsak and Feller in 1988. It is known from Belize.

References

Ataxia (beetle)
Beetles described in 1988